The 1924 Racine Legion season was their third in the league and last season as the Legion. The team improved on their previous output of 4–4–2, losing only three games. They finished seventh in the league.

Schedule

Standings

References

Racine Legion seasons
Racine Legion
Racine Legion